KPlus (Korean: 케이플러스) is a South Korean model and actors management company established by fashion model-turned-CEO Go Eun-kyung in 2008.

History

K-Plus was founded by former model Go Eun-kyung in 2008 to train future models and fashion industry professionals. In February 2014, K-Plus signed a contract for strategic partnership and share investment with talent agency YG Entertainment and finalised the merger with a new name called "YG KPLUS" in September. Go's former protege model-turned-actor Cha Seung-won would be training K-Plus models to become future actors.

In September 2014, top model Kang Seung-hyun signed a contract with YGKPlus.

In June 2017, for the first time in Vietnam's Next Top Model, starting from All-stars' cycle onwards, the winner will receive this contract for him/her to include in the roster list of models.

In May 2022, Green Snake Media acquisition a 50% share of the company.The company name later changes to KPLUS with dropping the YG brand.

Female models

Ahn Ye-won (Produce 48 contestant, eliminated in episode 5)
Bae Yoon-young
Cho Yelim
Choi Ah-reum*
Choi Ha-rim*
Choi Jung-in*
Choi Yeon-soo (Produce 48 contestant, eliminated in episode 5)
Choi Young-ji
Choi Sae-hui
 Choi Sora
Ellis Ahn
Gil Minso
Ha Naryoung
Han Hye-yeon
Hanna N
Huh Bo-mi
Hong Hyo
Hong Na-kyung*
Hwang Hyun-joo
Hwang Seung-eon
Hwang So-hee
Hyun Ji-eun
Jennie Kim*
Jeon Min ok
Ji ESuu
Ji Ho-jin
Jo Hye-joo
Ju Hee-jeong
Jung Han-sol
Jung Ji-young
Jung Soo-hyun*
Jung Yoo-sun
Kang Yoon-ji
Kim Eun-sun*
Kim Hae-ah
Kim Hyo-kyung
Kim Hyun-hee
Kim Jisoo*
Kim Sae-in*
Kim Sang-Won
Kim Su-bin*
Kim Yae-ji
Kim Ye-rim*
Ko Eun-bi*
Kwon Ji-ya*
Lalisa Manoban*
Lee Ha-eun
Lee Ho-jung
Lee Jay
Lee Ji-hye*
Lee Jung-hyun
Lee Roo-young
Lee Seung-mee
Lee Song-yi
Lee Su-jin
Lee Sung-kyung
Lee Yeon-joo*
Nadine Lee
Oh Hye-ji
Park Chaeyoung*
Park Jung-min*
Park Sae-jin*
Park Se-jeong
Park Su-jin
Park Sun-ha
Park Yae-woon
Shim Soyoung
Shin Ha-young
Shin Hey-nam
Shin Hye-jin*
Shin Hyun-ji
Shin Yae-min*
Song Hyun-min
Song Jae-hee*
Tiana Tolstoi
Um Ye-jin
Um Yoo-jung
Wu I-Hua
Yang Rira
Yeo Yeon-hui
Yoo Eun-bi
Yoon Seon-ah*

(* indicates models in Development)

Male models

Ahn Juni
Bae Joon-seok*
Bang Joo-ho
Cheon Sang-hun*
Cho David
Cho Hwan*
Cho Hyo-in
Cho Jae Hyung*
Cho Sung-hoon
Choi Chang-wook
Choi Han-bin
Choi Jeong-gab*
Choi Yeon-kyu
Erick Vic.
Go Ung-ho
Ha Seok-hwan*
Han Sol*
Jang Ki-yong
Joo Woo-jae
Joel Roberts*
Jeon Jun-yeong*
Jeong Rok-hui
Jiwon Hyuk
Jung Hyo-joon* (Produce 101 Season 2 contestant)
Jung Jong-won*
Jung Sung-joon
Jung Ui-sung
Jung Yongsoo
  Kang Hui
Kang Hyuk-moon
Kang Sung-jin
Kang Won-jae
Kim Alex*
Kim Bo-heon
Kim Gun-woo*
Kim Gyu-ho
Kim Hak-soo
Kim Han-byul
Kim Ho-sung*
Kim Hyun-jin
Kim Hyun-woo* (Produce 101 Season 2 contestant)
Kim Jong-hoon
Kim Jung-sik
Kim Ki-bum
Kim Kwan-joon*
Kim Min-jong
Kim Pil-su
Kim Seung-eun
Kim Seung-hyun
Kim Sung-yeon
Kim Tae-wan
Kim Tae-woo
Kim Woo-ram*
Kim Young-seok
Kwon Hyun-bin (Produce 101 Season 2 contestant and member of South Korean boy group JBJ)
Kwon Ju-hyung*
Lee Bom-chan
Lee Gi-hean
Lee Hyun-jun
Lee Hyun-wook
Lee Hyung-seok
Lee Jae-seok*
Lee Jin-kyeong
Lee Ji-seok
Lee Keun-yong
Lee Ki-taek
Lee Myoun-gil
Lee Seok-chan
Lee Soo-min*
Lee Soo-hyuk
Lee Woo-chan*
Lim Hoo-seok
Lim Jae-hyung
Meng Joo-ho
Nam Goong-dam
Nikita Tolstoi
Oh Jae-young*
Park Bo-sung
Park Byung-min
Park Hong
Park Hyeong-seop
Park Jong-ik*
Park Ki-tae
Park Min-Seop
Park Yae-chan*
Seo Soo-won
Seo Hong-seok
Seok Ji-an
Seong Woo-jin
Shin Jae-hyuk
Shin Dongho
Shin Yong-guk
Song Kyung-mok
Yoon Jun-woo
Yoon Su-ho
Yu Hyun-woo
Won Jeong Hwang 
Woo Jin-kyung

(* indicates models in Development)

Actors
Kang Dong-wook
Go Yi-jin
Gi Eun-su
Yoo Ji-ae
Kang Min-kyeung
Kim Hyun-jae
Nam Gung-dam
Nam Gyu-hee
Shin Ji-hoon

See also
 List of modeling agencies

References

External links
 
 Official blog

YG Entertainment
Modeling agencies
Entertainment companies established in 2008